Boybeyi is a village in the central district of Hakkâri Province in Turkey. The village is populated by Kurds of the Pinyanişî tribe and had a population of 242 in 2022.

The two hamlets of Musahanı and Yeşilbulak are attached to Boybeyi.

Etymology 
The name Asingiran means 'heavy iron' in Kurdish.

Population 
Population history from 2000 to 2022:

References 

Villages in Hakkâri District
Kurdish settlements in Hakkâri Province